{{Infobox mountain
| name = Schreckhorn
| photo = Schreckhorn peak.jpg
| photo_size = 285
| photo_caption = The Schreckhorn from the north
| elevation_m = 4,078
| elevation_ref = 
| prominence_m = 795
| prominence_ref = 
| isolation_km = 5.5
| isolation_ref = 
| translation = Peak of terror<ref>Fergus Fleming, Killing Dragons, Granta Books, 2011</ref>
| map = Switzerland
| map_caption = Location in Switzerland
| parent_peak = Finsteraarhorn
| location = Canton of Bern, Switzerland
| range = Bernese Alps
| coordinates = 
| range_coordinates = 
| first_ascent = 16 August 1861 by Leslie Stephen and party |
| normal_route=south-west ridge
}}

The Schreckhorn (4,078 m) is a mountain in the Bernese Alps. It is the highest peak located entirely in the canton of Berne. The Schreckhorn is the northernmost Alpine four-thousander and the northernmost summit rising above 4,000 metres in Europe.

 Geography 
The Schreckhorn is located 10 km south-east of Grindelwald between the Upper and Lower Grindelwald Glacier. The region is made up of uninhabited glacial valleys, the great Aar Glaciers and the Fiescher Glacier. The summit of the Lauteraarhorn is located very close and reaches almost the same altitude. The highest peak of the Bernese Alps, the Finsteraarhorn lies 6 km to the south.

Geologically the Schreckhorn is part of the Aarmassif.

 Climbing history

The first ascent was on 16 August 1861 by Leslie Stephen, Ulrich Kaufmann, Christian Michel and Peter Michel. Their route of ascent, via the upper Schreck Couloir to the Schrecksattel and then by the south-east ridge, was the normal route for the following fifty years, but is now seldom used.

The peak had been attempted several times before this, most notably by the Swiss naturalist Joseph Hugi in 1828 and the guided party of Pierre Jean Édouard Desor (a Swiss geologist) in 1842. 'The ambition of hoisting the first flag on the Schreckhorn, the one big Bernese summit which was untrodden, was far too obvious for us to resist', Desor later wrote, but they climbed a secondary summit of the Lauteraarhorn by mistake.

The first ascent by the south-west ridge (AD+) – the normal route by which the Schreckhorn is climbed – was made by John Wicks, Edward Branby and Claude Wilson on 26 July 1902. They decided to climb the very steep ridge without the help of local guides and succeeded in reaching the summit. The north-west ridge (the Andersongrat, D) was first climbed by John Stafford Anderson and George Percival Baker, with guides Ulrich Almer and Aloys Pollinger on 7 August 1883.

The Strahlegg Hut, destroyed by an avalanche, has been replaced by the Schreckhorn Hut (2,520 m). The Schreckhorn may also be ascended from the Gleckstein Hut (2,317 m) and the Lauteraar Hut (2,392 m).

See also

List of 4000 metre peaks of the Alps

References

 Dumler, Helmut and Willi P. Burkhardt, The High Mountains of the Alps, London: Diadem, 1994
 Engel, Claire: Mountaineering in the Alps, London: George Allen and Unwin, 1971

Further reading
 Smythe, Frank S., 'A Storm on the Schreckhorn', in Peaks, Passes and Glaciers'', ed. W. Unsworth, London: Allen Lane, 1981. An attempt on the south-west ridge in 1925.

External links

 The Schreckhorn on SummitPost
 Sunset on the Schreckhorn
 Paragliding around the Schreckhorn
 Schreckhorn in beautiful evening light
 Schreckhorn reflected in the Bachalpsee

Alpine four-thousanders
Bernese Alps
Mountains of Switzerland
Mountains of the Alps
Mountains of the canton of Bern
Four-thousanders of Switzerland